Meinzinger may refer to:

 Al Meinzinger, Royal Canadian Air Force officer
 Joseph Ignatino Meinzinger (1892 – 1962), Canadian insurance salesman and political figure